Mustafa Keçeli (born 15 April 1978) is a retired Turkish footballer.

Keçeli wears the number 23 jersey and his position is leftwinger.  He played for Petrolofisi (1997–1999), Ankaraspor (1999–2001), Denizlispor (2001–2006) and Trabzonspor (2006–2008) before joining to Bursaspor in June 2008.

Honours 
 Bursaspor
Süper Lig (1): 2009–10

References

1978 births
Living people
Turkish footballers
Bursaspor footballers
Denizlispor footballers
Trabzonspor footballers
Ankaraspor footballers
Mersin İdman Yurdu footballers
Süper Lig players
TFF First League players

Association football defenders